(born 12 January 1957 as Mutsuo Hidaka) is a Japanese former sumo wrestler from Nakatane, Kagoshima, Japan. His highest rank was ōzeki. He won two top division yūshō or tournament championships. He retired in 1987 and founded Matsugane stable in 1990 (now known as Hanaregoma stable).

Career
He came from a family of farmers. He was a classmate of Tsuyoshi Nagabuchi at junior high school. Wakashimazu wrestled for Futagoyama stable, joining in March 1975. Unlike most professional sumo wrestlers, he did not join from junior high school but instead joined after completing high school. He was a high school sumo champion but needed some persuasion from his stablemaster that he would be able to put on enough weight to succeed in professional sumo. He made his debut alongside future top division regulars Daijuyama and Kirishima. He reached the salaried sekitori ranks in March 1980 upon promotion to the jūryō division and reached the top makuuchi division in January 1981. He scored 10 wins in his makuuchi debut. He moved quickly through the division, winning five special prizes, two for Fighting Spirit and three for Technique. He reached sumo's second highest rank of ōzeki in January 1983 after two runner-up performances and 34 wins out of 45 in the three preceding tournaments. After a 10–5 in his ōzeki debut, he broke his leg in the following tournament, but made a remarkably quick recovery, with a 13–2 score and runner-up honours in the next tournament in May 1983.

Wakashimazu was popular with the crowds and his lean and swarthy appearance led to him being nicknamed the "Black Panther", His best year was in 1984, when he took two top division tournament championships in March and July, the second with a perfect 15–0 record, but he could manage only third place in the September 1984 tournament and missed out on promotion to the highest rank of yokozuna. Nevertheless he finished 1984 with 71 wins out of a possible 90, more than any other wrestler (the three yokozuna at the time, Kitanoumi, Chiyonofuji and Takanosato were all restricted by injury during the year). March 1985 saw his sixth and final runner-up performance. From November 1985 his results started to decline, and in an attempt to change his luck he switched from his trademark kelly green mawashi to a light blue one, but soon switched back when results did not improve. He retired in July 1987 at the age of thirty, leaving the Futagoyama stable without anyone in the san'yaku ranks for the first time in over fifteen years.

Retirement from sumo
After his retirement Wakashimazu set up his own training stable, Matsugane, early in 1990. The retirement of Harunoyama in November 2006 left the stable with no wrestlers in the top two divisions. He finally produced another sekitori in March 2010 when Matsutani (now Shōhōzan) was promoted to jūryō. In 2014 he switched his toshiyori or elder name to a more prestigious one, Nishonoseki, and renamed his stable accordingly.

In September 2010 he was demoted in the Sumo Association's hierarchy after he accepted lodgings in Osaka for the Haru tournament the previous March from a company president connected to gangsters. In addition, two of his wrestlers, Matsutani and the sandanme ranked Wakarikido, were suspended for two tournaments for illegal betting on baseball. However, he joined the Board of Directors in 2014, and was re-elected in 2016. Also in 2016 he became head of the judging department.

In October 2017 he was injured in a fall from his bicycle in Funabashi, Chiba, and underwent emergency surgery for a cerebral contusion. He stepped down from his judging duties and did not run for re-election to the Sumo Association board in 2018.

In December 2021, as he was approaching the mandatory retirement age of 65, he stood down as head coach of his stable, which was transferred to one of his coaches, the former maegashira Tamanoshima, and renamed Hanaregoma stable. He swapped elder names with the former yokozuna Kisenosato, and became Araiso Oyakata. He is staying with the Sumo Association for a further five years as a consultant.

Personal life
He has been married to former pop/enka singer Mizue Takada since 1985. Upon his promotion to the top division in 1981 he mentioned Takada in an interview as an ideal wife, four years before it happened.

Fighting style
Wakashimazu's favourite kimarite or techniques were hidari-yotsu, a right hand outside and left hand inside grip on his opponent's mawashi, yori-kiri (force out), uwatenage (overarm throw) and tsuri-dashi (lift out).

Career record

See also
Glossary of sumo terms
List of past sumo wrestlers
List of sumo elders
List of sumo tournament top division champions
List of sumo tournament top division runners-up
List of sumo tournament second division champions
List of ōzeki

References

External links
 Nishonoseki stable profile

1957 births
Living people
Japanese sumo wrestlers
Sumo people from Kagoshima Prefecture
Ōzeki